This page is about the World Bowls Tour Championships.

The 2023 Imagine Cruising World Indoor Bowls Championship will take place at Potters Leisure Resort, Hopton-on-Sea, Great Yarmouth, England, from 6 to 22 January 2023. 

There were two preliminary round ties in the open singles, with Jason Banks beating Darren Weir and Jon Wilson defeating Scott Edwards. Banks went on to reach the final where he met Jamie Walker. This was first time that the open/men's singles final featured two unseeded players since seeds were introduced in 1988. Previously eight unseeded players had reached finals (5 went on to win) but all eight had played seeded players in the final. 

In the final Walker gained a five shot lead after just two ends but Banks continually played close to the jack and drew level before Walker won the last end with the last bowl. The second set was also close with Banks leading before Walker managed to level the set on the last end and by doing so winning the title.

Katherine Rednall won her fifth women's singles to extend her record, she fought back after losing the first set to defeat Ceri Ann Glen in the tie break set.

Greg Harlow & Nick Brett won the Open Pairs defeating Jason Greenslade and Michael Stepney in the final. It was Brett's six title and Harlow's fifth title over all disciplines. Stewart Anderson and Ceri Ann Glen won the mixed pairs final, it was Anderson's sixth win over all disciplines.

Scotland's Daniel Pool became the first player to win consecutive Under-25 Singles titles.

Winners

Draw and results

Open Singles

Women's Singles

Open Pairs

Mixed Pairs

Open Under 25

References

External links
 World Bowls results at Potters Resorts

World Indoor Bowls Championship
2023 in bowls
World Indoor Bowls Championship
International sports competitions hosted by England
World Indoor Bowls Championship
Sport in Great Yarmouth
World Indoor Bowls